Sedat Berisha (born 3 September 1989) is a Macedonian professional footballer who plays as a centre back for KF Trepça '89.

Club career

Sloga Jugomagnat
Berisha broke into the Sloga Jugomagnat senior team in the 2009/2010 season earning 9 caps before being transferred to FK Milano Kumanovo in the winter break.

Milano Kumanovo
After the winter break, Berisha played 7 games for Milano. Berisha was influential on the pitch and a key player for Milano. However, Milano were relegated at the end of the 2009/2010 season. In the summer break, Tetovo based club KF Shkëndija bought him.

Shkëndija
In the 2010/2011 season, Berisha started in 30 matches and scored 1 goal for Shkëndija. At the end of the season, Berisha was established as one of the best defenders in Macedonia. During the winter break, Berisha trained with Hoffenheim before returning to Shkëndija when the season started again. After helping Shkëndija win the Macedonian Prva Liga and the Macedonian Super Cup, rumors circulated that Croatian club Hajduk Split were interested in signing the defender.

Bursaspor
In June 2015, Berisha agreed with Bursaspor.

Honours

Club
FK Shkëndija
Macedonian First League: 2011
Macedonian Super Cup: 2010-11

References

External links
 
 
 

1989 births
Living people
Footballers from Skopje
Albanian footballers from North Macedonia
Association football central defenders
Macedonian footballers
FK Sloga Jugomagnat players
KF Shkëndija players
FK Metalurg Skopje players
Bursaspor footballers
FK Shkupi players
KF Vllaznia Shkodër players
KF Tirana players
FC Drita players
FC Struga players
KF Trepça'89 players
Macedonian First Football League players
Süper Lig players
Kategoria Superiore players
Football Superleague of Kosovo players
Macedonian expatriate footballers
Expatriate footballers in Turkey
Macedonian expatriate sportspeople in Turkey
Expatriate footballers in Albania
Macedonian expatriate sportspeople in Albania
Expatriate footballers in Kosovo
Macedonian expatriate sportspeople in Kosovo
North Macedonia international footballers
North Macedonia youth international footballers
North Macedonia under-21 international footballers